The 1975 Kent State Golden Flashes football team was an American football team that represented Kent State University  in the Mid-American Conference (MAC) during the 1975 NCAA Division I football season. In their first season under head coach Dennis Fitzgerald, the Golden Flashes compiled a 4–7 record (1–6 against MAC opponents), finished in sixth place in the MAC, and were outscored by all opponents by a combined total of 289 to 202.

The team's statistical leaders included Dan Watkins with 916 rushing yards, Greg Kokal with 1,754 passing yards, and Kim Featsent with 563 receiving yards. Defensive back Cedric Brown was selected as a first-team All-MAC player.

Dennis Fitzgerald was hired as Kent State's head football coach in January 1975. Fitzgerald had been Kent State's defensive coordinator under Don James, who resigned in December 1974.

Schedule

References

Kent State
Kent State Golden Flashes football seasons
Kent State Golden Flashes football